George de Godzinsky (5 July 1914, Saint Peterburg, Russia — 23 May 1994, Espoo, Finland) was a Finnish composer, pianist and conductor of Polish descent. Godzinsky is known for his Schlager music although he composed music for movies and operettas.

De Godzinsky's father had Polish, Czech, Georgian and Romanian ancestry, his mother was of Dutch and Jewish descent.

George de Godzinsky's father was a Saint Petersburg-based civil servant and businessman who had strong ties to customers in Finland. During the Russian revolution the family escaped to Finland.

Between 1930 and 1937 de Godzinsky attended the Helsinki Conservatory. In 1935–36 de Godzinsky joined, as the lead pianist, the legendary opera singer Feodor Chaliapin on his renowned Far East tour. De Godzinsky performed with Chaliapin in fifty-seven concerts in Manchuria, China and Japan. In 1939 Godzinsky embarked on a career that would make him the chief conductor at a number of prominent Scandinavian theaters such as the Swedish Theatre, Helsinki, the Royal Dramatic Theatre, Stockholm, and the Gothenburg City Theatre, Gothenburg. The United States, Bergen, Norway, Warsaw, Poland and Paris, France tours of the Finnish National Opera, Helsinki, pursued between 1959 and 1965 proved  to be some of de Godzinskys career highlights. Moreover, between 1961 and 1965, he conducted the Finnish entries for the Eurovision Song Contest.

External links

 
 George de Godzinsky at Naxos

1914 births
1994 deaths
Finnish male composers
Musicians from Helsinki
Finnish music arrangers
Eurovision Song Contest conductors
20th-century conductors (music)
White Russian emigrants to Finland
20th-century male musicians
20th-century Finnish composers